The Frank G. Ray House & Carriage House, also known as Ray Towers, is a historic residence located in Vinton, Iowa, United States.  Ray was a local businessman who was associated with the Iowa Canning Company, the largest corporation in Benton County and a major employer in the region.  His 2½-story frame Queen Anne house features a complex composition that includes a wraparound front porch, three decorative chimneys, a three-story round tower, porte-cochère,
and small porches at various places on all stories.  The carriage house features decorative shingles and an irregular roofline that is capped with a cupola and weather vane.  They were listed together on the National Register of Historic Places in 1982.

References

Houses completed in 1890
Buildings and structures in Benton County, Iowa
National Register of Historic Places in Benton County, Iowa
Houses on the National Register of Historic Places in Iowa
Carriage houses on the National Register of Historic Places
Queen Anne architecture in Iowa
Vinton, Iowa